Los Serranos is a comarca in the province of Valencia, Valencian Community, Spain. It is part of the only Spanish-speaking area in the Valencian Community.

Geographically and historically Chera was part of this comarca. Nowadays, according to the current administrative division pattern of the Valencian Community, Chera is officially part of the Requena-Utiel comarca.

Municipalities
Alcublas
Alpuente
Andilla
Aras de los Olmos
Benagéber
Bugarra
Calles
Chelva
Chulilla
Domeño
Gestalgar
Higueruelas
Losa del Obispo
Pedralba
Sot de Chera
Titaguas
Tuéjar
Villar del Arzobispo
La Yesa

See also
Requena-Utiel

References

External links
Institut Valencià d'Estadística

 
Comarques of the Valencian Community
Geography of the Province of Valencia